Turbina B is an Albanian football club based in the city of Cërrik. They are currently competing in the Albanian Third Division.

References

Football clubs in Albania